Mahamevnawa Buddhist Monastery is an organization of Buddhist monasteries of Sri Lankan origin established to benefit from the spiritual development of human beings using the teachings of Gautama Buddha.  Its main monastery is in Polgahawela, Sri Lanka, and Sri Lanka is home to 40 branches of the organization. Overseas branches are in Canada, USA, Australia, UK, Dubai, South Korea, India, Italy, and Germany. And Mahamevnawa is home to more than 700 Buddhist monks.

The founder and chief Buddhist monk in charge of these monasteries is Kiribathgoda Gnanananda Thero, who is engaged in spreading Buddhism to both local and international communities, and in highlighting the aim of Buddhism: putting an end to Dukkha (suffering) or attaining Nibbana.

Mahamevnawa Anagarika Monastery 
Mahamevnawa monastery for Buddhist Nuns is called Mahamevnawa Anagarika Monastery. Currently, there are 6 Anagarika Monasteries of Mahamevnawa. About 100 Buddhists Nuns reside and practice Dhamma there.

Practicing Dhamma 

Mahamevnawa promotes the teaching, discussion, and practice of Dhamma in its unaltered form, and the first step the towards cessation of suffering is knowing Buddha's teaching. Mahamevnawa also facilitates the practice of meditation, for improving concentration and wisdom through cultivating mindfulness (Sathi) as a component of the path to Nibbāna. A monk also committed suicide by hanging in Welimada Mahamevnawa Monastery under mysterious circumstances. The founder has made no public comment about the mysterious death.  A key point that Mahmevnawa highlights are Dhamma not only says that life is suffering but shows a proven path to the cessation of suffering. Mahmevnawa is famous for operating in a cultish manner going against mainstream Buddhism in Sri Lanka. None of the Mahamevnawa monks have completed the required Pariven education in Sri Lanka. The founder has bypassed that established tradition to rapidly expand the monk capacity in the monastery.

Spreading Dhamma
Both lay and clergy associated with Mahamevnawa adhere to this. The way of preaching and teaching Dhamma adopted by the clergy at Mahamevnawa is what Buddha advocated.

Mahamevnawa makes available recorded sermons and Dhamma texts, based on the original teachings of Buddha, that reveal the truth in life and emphasize the urge of cession of suffering. Most of these publications are in Sinhalese, due to the initial Sri Lankan context, but English translations are also available.

To widen its Dhamma Service, Mahamevnawa monastery started a Buddhist television channel named Shraddha TV in 2012. Later Mahamevnawa started a radio channel named Shraddha Radio too. Founder also expelled 2nd in command Nawalapitiye Ariyawansa after realizing he had ambitions to become the abbot in the monastery several years ago.

References

External links
 

 
Buddhist monasteries in Sri Lanka
Buddhism in Sri Lanka